Nimrod was a wooden-hulled, three-masted sailing ship with auxiliary steam engine that was built in Scotland in 1867 as a whaler. She was the ship with which Ernest Shackleton made his Nimrod Expedition to Antarctica in 1908–09. After the expedition she returned to commercial service, and in 1919 she was wrecked in the North Sea with the loss of ten members of her crew.

Building and registration
Alexander Stephen and Sons built Nimrod in Dundee. Her launch date is not recorded, but she was completed in January 1867. She was rigged as a schooner. She had a single screw, driven by a 50 hp steam engine built by Gourlay Brothers of Dundee.

Her principal owner was Thomas B Job, who registered her at Liverpool. Her United Kingdom official number was 55047. They used her for whaling and seal hunting.

By 1874 Nimrod was rigged as a barquentine. By 1888 her owners were listed as Job Brothers. By 1889 she had the code letters KWVT, and in that year Job Brothers re-registered her in St John's, Newfoundland. By 1891 her original engine had been replaced by a two-cylinder compound engine built by Westray, Copeland & Co of Barrow-in-Furness. It was rated at 60 hp and gave her a speed of only .

Nimrod expedition
In 1907 the shipbuilder William Beardmore bought Nimrod and re-registered her in London as a yacht to serve as Shackleton's expedition ship. The purchase price was £5,000. She was in poor condition, needing caulking and renewal of her masts. In June 1907 she reached London, where she was overhauled.

King Edward VII and Queen Alexandra visited the ship, and on 11 August she left for Antarctica, captained by Rupert England. She sailed via Australia and New Zealand, and on 1 January 1908 she left New Zealand for the Southern Ocean. The Union Company Chairman Sir James Mills and the New Zealand Government each paid half the cost of the tow. From 14 January Nimrod continued under her own power.

On 29 January 1908 Nimrod reached McMurdo Sound on 3 February she reached Cape Royds, where she landed Shackleton's equipment and expedition team. Shackleton became dissatisfied with Captain England, who often moved Nimrod away from shore when he feared the sea ice was unsafe. On 22 February she finished unloading and left for New Zealand, leaving Shackleton's party ashore to make their expedition.

Shackleton had Captain England replaced by Frederick Pryce Evans, who had captained Koonya when she towed Nimrod south in January 1908. In January 1909 Evans brought Nimrod back to Antarctica to rendezvous with the returning expedition team, which Shackleton had split into parties, each with its own objective. The "Northern Party" had explored Victoria Land, and on 2 February 1909 reached its arranged rendezvous point to meet the ship, but heavy drifting snow prevented Nimrods lookouts from seeing the Northern Party's camp. She continued to the Ferrar Glacier, where she picked up a three-man party who had been doing geological work. She then returned, and two days later succeeded in finding and re-embarking the Northern Party.

Nimrod then anchored off the Erebus Ice Tongue, and between 28 February and 4 March re-embarked Shackleton's "Southern Party", who had made the first successful ascent of Mount Erebus and had unsuccessfully tried to reach the South Pole. She had now re-embarked all of Shackleton's team and left Antarctica, reaching New Zealand on 23 March 1909. Shackleton's team named some features of Antarctica's geography after the ship, including the Nimrod Glacier.

Later career and loss
By 1911 Shackleton owned Nimrod. In 1913 her owner was a Roland V Webster. By 1917 her owner was The SS Nimrod Ltd, her manager was an Emile Dickers, and her code letters were JNFD.

In January 1919 Nimrod, commanded by a Captain Duncan, left Blyth, Northumberland with a cargo of coal for Calais. On the night of 29–30 January she ran aground on the Barber Sands off Caister-on-Sea, Norfolk. Her engine room flooded, killing her chief engineer. Her remaining 11 crew sheltered under her bridge. They fired distress flares, which were seen ashore. The Caister lifeboat tried to reach her, but was unsuccessful. Nimrods crew launched her lifeboat, but the heavy sea capsized it. After six hours the boat was driven ashore, with two survivors clinging to it.

The bodies of seven of her crew were washed ashore. Captain Duncan's body was found north of Caister. Five bodies were found between Gorleston-on-Sea and Hopton-on-Sea, and one was found at California.

See also
List of Antarctic exploration ships from the Heroic Age, 1897–1922

References

Bibliography

1867 ships
Auxiliary steamers
Barquentines
Ernest Shackleton
Exploration ships of the United Kingdom
Maritime incidents in 1919
Merchant ships of the United Kingdom
Schooners
Ships built in Dundee
Shipwrecks in the North Sea
Whaling ships
World War I ships of the United Kingdom